Psohlavci is a Czech-language opera in 3 acts by Karel Kovařovic to a libretto by Karel Šípek after Psohlavci (The Dogheads) by Alois Jirásek. It premiered 24 April 1898, at the Prague National Theatre.

Cast
Hančí 
Jan Sladký-Kozina
Kryštof Hrubý
Matěj Přibek 
Stará Kozinová

Recordings
Drahomíra Tikalová, Beno Blachut, Václav Bednář, Marie Veselá, Vladimír Jedenáctík, Oldřich Kovář, Zdeněk Otava, Miluše Dvořáková Prague National Theatre Orchestra, Prague National Theatre Chorus, František Dyk 1961

References

1898 operas
Operas by Karel Kovařovic